Thelodus (from  , 'nipple' and  , 'tooth') is an extinct genus of thelodont agnathan that lived during the Silurian period. Fossils have been found in Europe, Asia and North America. Unlike many thelodonts, species of Thelodus are known not only from scales, but from impressions in rocks. Some species, such as the Canadian T. inauditus, are thought to be comparable in size to other thelodonts, i.e., from 5 to 15 centimeters in length. The scales of the type species, T. parvidens (syn. T. macintoshi) of Silurian Great Britain, however, reach the size of coins, and, if proportioned like other thelodonts, such as Loganellia, the living animal would have been about one meter in length.

References

Thelodonti genera
Silurian jawless fish
Prehistoric fish of Asia
Prehistoric fish of Europe
Prehistoric fish of North America
Paleozoic life of New Brunswick